Etibar Salidar oglu Mammadov (Etibar Səlidar oğlu Məmmədov) (born April 2, 1955 in Baku, Azerbaijan) is an Azerbaijani politician and the Founder and Leader of National Independence Party of Azerbaijan (NIPA). Etibar Mammadov is also the Vice-Chairman of International Democrat Union (IDU). 

Since 1988, Etibar Mammadov has played an active role in the early stages of the national democratic movement. He actively participated in the forming of the PFP's Temporary Initiative Center. Mr Mammadov was also elected one of the first board member of the center. In 1989, the massive strikes was leading by Etibar Mammadov. He was later arrested by the KGB during a press conference in Moscow following the January 1990 events. Mr Mammadov spent nine months in the Lefortovo prison. During this period 1.5 million signatures were collected for his release.  He was released from Lefortovo Prison in November 1990 and in December Etibar Mammadov was elected member of the Parliament.  In 1991 he co-chaired “Demblock” in the Parliament of the Republic of Azerbaijan. He also became a member of the “State Defense Council” which was established by the President of the Republic of Azerbaijan in the same year. He is the co-author of the Constitutional Act "On the State Independence of Azerbaijan". He was the head of the Azerbaijani delegation in Turkey and Pakistan in recognition of the state independence. In October 1991, after separating from the Popular Front, Etibar Mammadov founded the National Independence Party of Azerbaijan. At the first congress of the party, he was elected chairman of the NIPA. He is currently the Vice-president of the International Democratic Union, which unites more than 70 center-right political parties.

From 1990 to 2000 Etibar Mammadov was a member of the Milli Majlis of the Republic of Azerbaijan. In 1995, he also became a member of the Constitutional Commission of the Republic of Azerbaijan, chaired by Heydar Aliyev. In 1998 and 2003, Etibar Mammadov was a candidate for the presidency.

He is married and has three children.

Early life 
In 1972, Etibar Mammadov joined the Faculty of History of Baku State University. While still studying at the university, he worked in secret societies, wrote an article for the university's wallpaper on the South Azerbaijan issue and was expelled from the university for this article. After many difficulties, he was readmitted to the university and graduated in 1978. 
After graduating, Etibar Mammadov began his career as a lecturer at the Baku State University. In 1985   he defended his thesis on "Russian tsarism and the Supreme Soviet in the 19th century” and obtained his PhD degree.

Political career 
Etibar Mammadov has actively participated in political processes since his early period of studying. At the Baku State University, E. Mammadov worked in secret societies. He is involved in the creation of a university wall newspaper called "Odlar Yurdu" and is the author of the main article on the “National Government in Southern Azerbaijan”. He was suspended from the university on December 21, 1974 due to this article. However, Etibar Mammadov, was readmitted to the university a year later and continued to participate in political processes.

In 1988-1989, Etibar Mammadov, a young professor, was still at the forefront of these events and was detained on the first rally. On November 18, 1988, Etibar Mammadov was taken to the “Sabail police station”. However,  all the pressures, the blackmail against him did not work as intended and the rallies were getting stronger day by day, the administration had to release him and fined him with small charges.

During the national movement Etibar Mammadov, not only enlightened people who were on the rallies, he also informed people in the different region about the purpose and function of the movement through interviews on RFE / RL. It played a crucial role in providing detailed information about what is really happening in Azerbaijan. Through these interviews, Etibar Mammadov managed to break a blockade of information. 
E.Mammadov, who has played an outstanding role in the creation of the Popular Front (PF), was elected to the first board of Popular Front at the founding conference. Even at the first meeting, he proposes to the PF board on adding articles regarding the state independence of Azerbaijan.

Etibar Mammadov led the rallies, as well as the Strike Committee on the demands of Azerbaijan to leave the USSR. At his call, many businesses were joining to the strike. Due to the failure to meet the demands of the rallies, a two-day, one-week-long national strike was prepared and held on August 21–22, 1989, under the leadership of E. Mammadov. Following these massive events, a 10-item agreement was signed between the Communist Party of Azerbaijan and the Board if Popular Front of Azerbaijan on 13 September 1989.  Etibar Mammadov called on the Supreme Soviet to declare a strike in the country by interrupting the speech of the then head of the Azerbaijani SSR Abdulrakhman Vazirov.

“January 20” events and Etibar Mammadov's arrest 
In order to inform the world community about the January 20 events and the decision of the Supreme Soviet, Etibar Mammadov went to Moscow for holding a press conference. Despite all the difficulties and dangers, Etibar Mammadov managed to sneak out of Baku secretly and hold a press conference for local and foreign journalists at the Permanent Mission of Azerbaijan in Moscow on January 25, 1990. At the same press conference, he called Red Army “the invaders”. Etibar Mammadov declared that Mikhail Gorbachev was directly responsible for what happened in Azerbaijan. The same night, the Alfa group of the KGB attacked to the Azerbaijani delegation and demolished the building, arrested Etibar Mammadov and took him to Lefortovo Prison.

Etibar Mammadov, ignored the USSR's demands to appeal to the public to stop the rallies. Mammadov said the fight continue until the end. At the same time protests and hunger strike were growing day by day regarding arrest of Etibar Mammadov in Baku and in all regions of Azerbaijan. Not only in Baku, the protests began to take place in Moscow in front of the Kremlin and in the United States in New York. 
1,5 million signed a petition for the release of Etibar Mammadov from prison. Local and international newspapers published articles on the protection of political prisoners.  As a result, of a long struggle, a decision was made to hold the trial of Etibar Mammadov in Azerbaijan. On November 1–2, 1990, the trial was held in Baku. Etibar Mammadov was released and he went to the Martyrs' Lane directly from the courtroom.

Etibar Mammadov’s role in recognition of Azerbaijan's state independence. 
Although Azerbaijan declared its independence in 1991, there were some issues in recognizing the independence of the state by the world. Etibar Mammadov took responsibility in this crucial mission. First, a delegation led by Etibar Mammadov went to Republic of Turkey. Despite the fact that the official letter of the Supreme Soviet was submitted to the administration of the Republic of Turkey, the attitude of the Turkish authorities was ambiguous. Turkish officials were concerned that their decision  would be understood as interfering in the internal affairs of the Soviet Union. Nevertheless, the delegation led by Etibar Mammadov was able to hold numerous meetings in Turkey. Eventually,  on November 10, 1991, The Republic of Turkey officially recognized the state independency of Azerbaijan.  After that, Mammadov made an official visit to Pakistan on December 4, 1991, as the head of a delegation of six members of the parliament. There were also numerous meetings with Pakistani Prime Minister Mohammad Nawaz Sharif, Senate Speaker, acting Speaker of Parliament and members of Senate Foreign Relations Commission. As a result, the state independence of Azerbaijan was also recognized by Pakistan in December 1991.

Etibar Mammadov also played an important role in creating the material and technical base of the newly created Azerbaijani army. In this way, the provision of the army with weapons, as well as the provision of soldiers and officers with uniforms and other necessary means, remained as one of the main problems of the Azerbaijani government at that time. During this difficult period, Etibar Mammadov was approached to address these issues. As a result of Etibar Mammadov's efforts, the National Army was provided with weapons and financial resources.

The first officially registered party in Azerbaijan 
The next stage of Etibar Mammadov's activities is related establishing the National Independence Party of Azerbaijan. Mammadov said that the Popular Front had already completed its mission – “Azerbaijan's struggle for independence” and therefore it is important to move on to the next stage. The Founding Congress of NIPA was held on July 3–4, 1992, and on July 17, 1992, the National Independence Party was  registered by the Ministry of Justice as the first political party in Azerbaijan. Thus, NIPA has become the first officially registered party.

As the Chairman of NIPA, Etibar Mammadov was a member of Parliament from 1995 to 2000. In 1998-2003, he ran for the presidency of the Republic of Azerbaijan.

In 2004, Etibar Mammadov resigned from the Chairmanship of NIPA. However, he was declared an Honorary Leader of NIPA by the decision of the Party Congress.

References

External link

1955 births
Politicians from Baku
Baku State University alumni
Living people